Antonio Miguel Sagardía-De Jesús (born August 11, 1957) is a Puerto Rican lawyer who served as Secretary of Justice of Puerto Rico, appointed by Governor Luis Fortuño and sworn in by Secretary of State Kenneth McClintock on January 2, 2009. He resigned effective December 23, 2009.

Controversies
In May 2009 Mr. Sagardía was involved in a confrontation with representative Luis Vega Ramos during a budget hearing after Vega Ramos questioned contracts the Puerto Rico Justice Department had awarded to Sagardia's former partner Víctor A. Ramos. It had previously surfaced that Sagardia, acting as Attorney General, had granted the release from prison of a convicted murderer represented by his former partner.  During the confrontation Mr. Sagardia excitedly called Vega Ramos a scoundrel, a chump lawyer and an intellectual dwarf.

Upon resigning his post as Secretary of Justice of Puerto Rico, Sagardía then represented murder suspect, Ana Cacho, in a high-profile case, a move that was seen as unethical by many.

Duties and Powers
As the top law enforcement official in Puerto Rico, Sagardía headed a unified prosecutorial system in which all district attorneys are appointed by the Governor and served under Attorney General Sagardía.

On its own discretion and authority, the Office of the Attorney General may investigate constitutional and politically sensitive issues.

Prior to taking office, Sagardía embarked on the task of reviewing the Justice Department's conduct, during several politically sensitive investigations carried out under his predecessor.

Line of Succession
In the event that the Governor of Puerto Rico is traveling away from Puerto Rico, the Attorney General is second in the line of succession, after the Secretary of State.

On January 18, 2009, Attorney General Sagardía served as the first Acting Governor of Puerto Rico during the 2009–2013 term, when Governor Fortuño and Secretary of State McClintock both attended the inaugural ceremonies of then President-elect Barack Obama.

Personal Background
Sagardía, born in 1957, is a former district attorney and attorney in private practice, before and after serving as Attorney General.

He is a member of the Governor's New Progressive Party of Puerto Rico, and a graduate of the University of Puerto Rico.

References

1957 births
Living people
Members of the 15th Cabinet of Puerto Rico
Secretaries of Justice of Puerto Rico
University of Puerto Rico alumni